Wahoola! is the second full-length studio album by London-based composer/producer Matthew Gilbert Linley, and was released in December 2010.

Track listing

Personnel

Musicians
Matthew Gilbert Linley: Synths, organs, celeste and piano, drums and percussion.
Maud Waret: Vocals. 
Roger Linley: Double bass, bass guitar.
Kenny Paterson: Bass guitar on 1 and 8.
Brian Lee: Violin, spoken word on 5.
Geoff Irwin: Viola.
Masumi Yamamoto: Harpsichord.
Kai Hoffman: French horn.
Feargal Murray: Flugel Horn, backing vocals on 8.
Lettie Maclean: Vocals on 8.
Ruby Aspinall: Harp.
Rhodri Davies: Harp on 2 and 8.
Paul Bishop: Banjo.
Jeanine Moss: Flute.

Production
Recorded and produced by Matthew Gilbert Linley in London, except:
Drums recorded at Goldtop Studios.
Mixed in London by Kenny Paterson.
Mastered by Duncan Cowell at Sound Mastering London.

References

External links
 Gilbert Soundcloud page

2010 albums